Aechmea echinata is a species of flowering plant in the genus Aechmea. This species is endemic to the State of Bahia in eastern Brazil.

The Latin specific epithet of echinata refers to hedgehog, from echinus.

References

echinata
Flora of Brazil
Plants described in 1995